Brevig Mission ( or) is a city in Nome Census Area, Alaska. The population was 388 at the 2010 census, up from 276 in 2000. It is named for the Norwegian Lutheran pastor Tollef L. Brevig, who served at the mission that would later bear his name. First settled in 1900, the mission became known as Teller Mission before receiving its current name. The mostly Inupiat Eskimo population continues to practice subsistence. Brevig Mission is a dry village, which means the sale or possession of alcohol is illegal.

Geography
Brevig Mission is located at  (65.334235, -166.492952).

Demographics

Brevig Mission first appeared on the 1950 U.S. Census and in 1960 as the unincorporated village of "Teller Mission." In 1969, it was formally incorporated under its present name of Brevig Mission.

As of the census of 2000, there were 276 people, 68 households, and 53 families residing in the city. The racial makeup of the city was 8.0% White, 90.6% Native American, and 1.5% from two or more races. Hispanic or Latino of any race were 0.7% of the population.

Of the 68 households, 52.9% had children under the age of 18 living with them, 30.9% were married couples living together, 25.0% had a female householder with no husband present, and 20.6% were non-families. 14.7% of all households were made up of individuals, and none had someone living alone who was 65 years of age or older. The average household size was 4.06 and the average family size was 4.35.

In the city, the age distribution of the population shows 45.3% under the age of 18, 12.3% from 18 to 24, 28.6% from 25 to 44, 10.1% from 45 to 64, and 3.6% who were 65 years of age or older. The median age was 20 years. For every 100 females, there were 101.5 males. For every 100 females age 18 and over, there were 118.8 males.

The median income for a household in the city was $21,875, and the median income for a family was $16,786. Males had a median income of $11,250 versus $25,000 for females. The per capita income for the city was $7,278. About 43.3% of families and 48.4% of the population were below the poverty line, including 50.8% of those under age 18 and none of those age 65 or over.

Education
Brevig Mission is served by the Bering Strait School District. Brevig Mission School serves grades Pre-K through 12.

1918 Spanish Flu
The pandemic caused by the 1918 influenza outbreak was by far the most devastating single disease outbreak in modern history, killing at least 50 million people during an 18-month period. In Brevig Mission alone, it killed 72 out of 80 residents in a 5-day period. The 72 victims were buried in the frozen ground in a mass grave dug for them by gold miners and marked by white crosses. As happened elsewhere in the Americas after the arrival of Columbus, Indigenous Alaska Natives had no genetic resistance to any flu, so it decimated many villages.

In 1997, a team of scientists led by Johan Hultin exhumed the frozen remains of an Iñupiat woman who had been buried in the permafrost in a gravesite near Brevig Mission in a successful attempt to recover RNA from her lung tissue. It enabled them to analyze the structure of the 1918 influenza virus (Spanish flu), which may have originated in Fort Riley, Kansas, that killed her.

References

External links

Cities in Alaska
Cities in Nome Census Area, Alaska
Populated coastal places in Alaska on the Pacific Ocean
Populated places in the Seward Peninsula